Rüdigershagen is a village in the municipality of Niederorschel in Eichsfeld, Thuringia, Germany. Rüdigershagen is located one the north slope of the Dün hills, and has approximately 600 inhabitants (31 December 1995: 618).

History

First documented: 1273
Manor, built: 1590, partly demolished in 1984
First school founded in 1607, new building in 1682
Church, rebuilt in 1686

External links
 

Villages in Thuringia
Eichsfeld (district)